David Roy may refer to:

 David C. Roy (born 1952), kinetic sculptor
 David Tod Roy (1933–2016), American sinologist and scholar of Chinese literature